Alan Key may refer to:
 Alan Key (rugby union), an England national rugby union player
 Allen key, a tool with a hexagonal cross-section used to drive bolts and screws

See also
 Alan Kay (born 1940), American computer scientist
 Alan Lee Keyes (born 1950), an American conservative political activist, author and former ambassador